Charles Antoine Micaud (France, 1910 - Denver, June 23, 1974) was a sociologist, author and American professor. Born in France, he emigrated to the United States in 1936. He was a professor in the universities of Bowdoin College, Virginia and Denver. On 29 March 1941 he married Nancy Waddel.

It was author of works like The French Right and Nazi Germany, 1933-1939 (1943), The Droite devant l'Allemagne (1945), Communism and the French Left. (1963), Tunisia: The Politics of Modernization (1964), between others, in addition to editor of Arabs and Berbers. From tribe to Nation in North Africa (1974), beside Ernest Gellner. He died due to cancer.

References

Bibliography 
 
 
 
 
 
 
 

1974 deaths
Deaths from cancer in Colorado
20th-century American historians
American male non-fiction writers
1910 births
20th-century American male writers
French emigrants to the United States